Goruh (also Romanized as Gorūh, Gorooh, and Gorveh; also known as Gorū, Gooroo, and Guru) is a village in Hoseynabad-e Goruh Rural District, Rayen District, Kerman County, Kerman Province, Iran. At the 2006 census, its population was 453, in 107 families.

References 

Populated places in Kerman County